Rudolph V. Dinnini (October 19, 1926 – December 16, 1998) is a former Republican member of the Pennsylvania House of Representatives.

References

Republican Party members of the Pennsylvania House of Representatives
1998 deaths
1926 births
20th-century American politicians